Vietnam National University, Hanoi (VNU; , ĐHQGHN) is a public research university in Vietnam. The university has 10 member colleges (called "universities") and faculties. VNU is one of two Vietnam's national universities, ranked 201–250th in Asia by the QS ASIA University Rankings 2020. In 2020, it was one of the first two Vietnamese universities (the other one being Vietnam National University, Ho Chi Minh City) to be included in the QS Global Ranking of Top 150 universities under 50 years old by 2021.

History

Throughout its history, the university has had several name changes: the University of Indochina (Université Indochinoise, 東洋大學 or Đại học Đông Dương; established in 1906), Vietnam National University (Trường Đại học Quốc gia Việt Nam; November 1945), and the University of Hanoi (Trường Đại học Tổng hợp Hà Nội; June 1956). In 1993, Vietnam National University, Hanoi (Đại học Quốc gia Hà Nội) was created by merging the University of Hanoi, Hanoi National University of Education (HNUE) and College of Foreign Languages.

The institution also owns two high schools for gifted students in foreign languages (Foreign Language Specialized School) and natural science (High School for Gifted Students, Hanoi University of Science).

Board of Directors

 President: Lê Quân
 Vice President: Nguyễn Hoàng Hải
 Vice President: Phạm Bảo Sơn

Member institutions

Vietnam National University, Hanoi includes the following members (universities, schools):

 VNU University of Science (VNU-HUS)
 VNU University of Social Sciences and Humanities (VNU-USSH)
 VNU University of Languages and International Studies (VNU-ULIS)
 VNU University of Engineering and Technology (VNU-UET)
 VNU University of Economics and Business (VNU-UEB)
 College of Economics, Vietnam National University
 VNU University of Education (VNU-UED)
 VNU University of Medicine and Pharmacy (VNU-UMP)
 VNU Vietnam Japan University (VNU-VJU)
 VNU School of Law (VNU-LS)
 VNU School of Business (VNU-HSB)
 VNU International School (VNU-IS)
 VNU School of Interdisciplinary Studies (VNU-SIS)

University rankings 

The university attained a ranking in the 201–250 grouping in Asia, under the QS ASIA University Rankings 2020. Also in the same year, it  attained a THE World University Ranking in the 801–1000 group, and a THE World University Ranking Asia in the 201–250 group.

Notable people

 Anderson Cooper
 Nguyễn Thái Học
 Võ Nguyên Giáp - (Red Napoleon)
 Phạm Xuân Nguyên
 Ngô Bảo Châu - (Fields Medal)
 Đàm Thanh Sơn - (Dirac Medal)
 Hoàng Tụy - (Constantin Caratheodory Prize)
 Nguyễn Phú Trọng - (General Secretary) 
 Lê Đức Thọ - (Nobel Peace Prize) 
 Trần Quang Đức
 Đào Duy Anh
 Joe Ruelle
 Phan Huy Lê
 Lê Văn Thiêm - (Mathematician)
 Van H. Vu - (Pólya Prize)
 Tạ Bích Loan
 Tran Duc Thao
 Trần Quốc Vượng

References

External links 

 (English)

 
Educational institutions established in 1906
1906 establishments in French Indochina